Peter George Oliver Freund (7 September 1936, Timișoara – 6 March 2018, Chicago) was a professor of theoretical physics at the University of Chicago. He made important contributions to particle physics and string theory. He was also active as a writer.

Biography
Peter George Oliver Freund was born, raised and educated in the Romanian city of Timișoara, where he attended the Politehnica University of Timișoara. Because of his participation in an anti-Soviet demonstration in November 1956, Freund was arrested by the communist security police, the Securitate, and lined up with other students between a wall and a line of tanks, essentially an armored firing squad, which, in the reigning confusion, did not fire.

In 1959 he managed to leave Romania. Freund obtained his PhD in theoretical physics at the University of Vienna, with Walter Thirring as his thesis adviser. Since 1965 Freund was on the faculty of the University of Chicago. He lived in Chicago with his wife Lucy, a clinical psychologist. They have two daughters, both married (Pauline, an attorney in Seattle and Caroline, an economist in Washington, D.C.), as well as five grandchildren.

Research
Freund was one of the originators of two-component duality which gave the original impetus to what then developed into string theory.  He pioneered the modern unification of physics through the introduction of extra dimensions of space and found mechanisms by which the extra dimensions curl up.

Freund made significant contributions, to the theory of magnetic monopoles, to supersymmetry and supergravity, to number-theoretic aspects of string theory, as well as to the phenomenology of hadrons.

Writer
Beyond his work in theoretical physics, Freund was the author of the book A Passion for Discovery, World Scientific, Singapore, New York, London 2007.

Over the years, in addition to scientific papers, Freund wrote short stories, and in 2001 he began publishing them. His stories appear in the online literary journal Exquisite Corpse and in other journals.

In addition to short stories, Freund wrote two novellas, The Fine Underwear of Consciousness and Upside Down, as well as the novel Belonging. Together with his childhood friend, the Romanian novelist Radu Ciobanu, he wrote in the Romanian language the book Dialog peste Atlantic (Dialog Across the Atlantic), published by Emia in 2006. The book deals with the way two friends, separated for half a century, view world events, arts, science, and ultimately try to catch up on two lives lived under very different conditions: Freund managed to leave Romania for the West, while Radu Ciobanu lived through the horrors of the communist dictatorship.

The book West of West End, a collection of Freund’s short stories, appeared in October 2008. Another collection of short stories, Tales in a Minor Key was published in 2012.

Publications

http://articles.chicagotribune.com/2012-03-25/news/ct-talk-brotman-physicist-20120324_1_peter-freund-stories-sandmeyer-s-bookstore

Notes

References

External links

 Exquisite Corpse

1936 births
2018 deaths
Scientists from Timișoara
Romanian Jews
American string theorists
Romanian emigrants to the United States
University of Chicago faculty
Fellows of the American Physical Society
University of Vienna alumni
Politehnica University of Timișoara alumni